Saeed bin Butti (Arabic سعيد بن بطي ) was the third Ruler of Dubai, succeeding Maktoum bin Butti bin Suhail on his death in 1852. He was a signatory to the landmark treaty with the British, the Perpetual Maritime Truce of 1853.

The brother of Maktoum, who died of natural causes, Saeed inherited a small but thriving coastal community. Maktoum's own son, Hasher, was considered too young to rule.

Perpetual Maritime Truce 
Dubai's burgeoning pearl fishing fleet competed with those of Abu Dhabi, Sharjah and the other coastal towns and annual treaties were made between the Rulers and the British to safeguard the various fleets during the pearling season. These treaties were signed between 1835 and 1843 and then superseded by a ten-year treaty signed in June 1843. This treaty, policed by the British, was generally agreed to have been successful and so the British political resident in Bushire, a Captain Kemball, proposed a permanent treaty.

In May 1853, Saeed was a signatory to this treaty, the "Perpetual Maritime Truce", which prohibited any act of aggression at sea by the subjects or dependants of the signatory Rulers. The truce was signed by Saeed Abdulla bin Rashid of Umm Al Quwain; Hamed bin Rashid of Ajman; Saeed bin Tahnoun ('Chief of the Beniyas') and Sultan bin Saqr ('Chief of the Joasmees'). The treaty effectively established a British protectorate on the Trucial Coast, the Rulers all agreeing to escalate any disputes or acts of aggression to the British Resident, who was resident in Sharjah, or the 'Commodore at Bassidore' and submit to their judgement.

A further engagement for the suppression of the slave trade was signed by Saeed and the other Trucial Sheikhs in 1856.

Despite agreeing treaties of maritime truce, the Trucial Sheikhs found relationships with the tribes of the interior often fractious and in 1857 men from the Sharjah dependency of Abu Hail attacked an encampment of Al Mazari (Mazrouei) tribesmen at Khawaneej. In response to the raid, Sheikh Saeed bin Butti, with the help of Abu Dhabi, defeated Sharjah and a peace was negotiated in March 1857 with the assistance of the British Resident Agent.

Death 
Sheikh Saeed died in December 1859 of smallpox, the disease which had killed his brother Maktoum and which also killed another brother and a nephew.

See also 
 Al Maktoum

References

Maktoum family
Rulers of Dubai
19th-century Arabs